Gorgonum or Gorgoneum may refer to:

Flora
Aeonium gorgoneum, a flower species found in Cape Verde
Artemisia gorgonum, a sagebrush species found in Cape Verde
Elaphoglossum gorgoneum, a fern species in the subfamily Elaphoglossoideae
Helianthemum gorgoneum, a sunflower species found in Cape Verde
Papaver gorgoneum, a flower species found in Cape Verde

Other
Gorgonum, a classical albedo feature located in the northwest of the Phaethontis quadrangle on Mars
Gorgonum Chaos, a chaotic feature located in the northwest of the Phaethontis quadrangle on Mars